Greece (GRE) has competed at the European Indoor Athletics Championships since the 1970 edition in Vienna, Austria. As of 2017, Greek athletes have won a total of 36 medals. Most of them (11) were won in the event of 60 metres.

Medals by European Indoor Championships

Medalists

See also
 Greece at the IAAF World Championships in Athletics
 Greece at the IAAF World Indoor Championships in Athletics
 Greece at the European Athletics Championships

References

 
Nations at the European Athletics Indoor Championships